In the 2008–09 season, USM Alger competed in the Division 1 for the 31st time, as well as the Arab Champions League and the Algerian Cup. It was their 14th consecutive season in the top flight of Algerian football.

Players
Last updated on  18 November 2016

Competitions

Overview

Division 1

Results summary

Results by round

Matches

Algerian Cup

Champions League

Round 32

Round 16

Squad information

Playing statistics

Appearances (Apps.) numbers are for appearances in competitive games only including sub appearances
Red card numbers denote:   Numbers in parentheses represent red cards overturned for wrongful dismissal.

Goalscorers
Includes all competitive matches. The list is sorted alphabetically by surname when total goals are equal.

Clean sheets
Includes all competitive matches.

Transfers

In

Out

References

USM Alger seasons
USM Alger